Juncus bulbosus, the bulbous rush, is a species of flowering plant in the genus Juncus, native to Iceland, the Faroes, Europe, Macaronesia, and northwest Africa. It has been introduced to Australia, New Zealand, and some locations in northern North America. It is capable of nuisance growth in lakes and streams.

References

bulbosus
Flora of Europe
Flora of Algeria
Flora of Morocco
Flora of Tunisia
Flora of Macaronesia
Taxa named by Carl Linnaeus
Plants described in 1753